Sam Stone is the horror and fantasy pen name for British Thriller novellist and screenwriter Samantha Lee Howe. She is best known for her USA Today! best selling novel The Stranger In Our Bed published by HarperCollins imprint One More Chapter. This novel has recently been made into a film by production company Buffalo Dragon, The film, directed by Giles Alderson and starring Samantha Bond, Emily Berrington, Ben Lloyd-Hughes, Joseph Marcell, Nina Wadia, Bart Edwards and Terri Dwyer, was released on 1st July 2022 on Showtime Networks. Samantha has since sold three more books to HarperCollins One More Chapter and all three were published in 2021 as The House of Killers Trilogy which consists of The House of Killers Book 1, Kill or Die Book 2, and Kill A Spy Book 3.

Samantha is the commissioning editor of Telos Publishing imprint Telos Moonrise. In 2022, Samantha edited a charity anthology for Telos Publishing in aid of advocacy charity POhWER. The anthology, Criminal Pursuits: Crimes Through Time, was submitted to the Crime Writer's Association for consideration for the CWA Short Story Dagger and five stories from the 14 included were longlisted, three of which made the shortlist resulting in Flesh of a Fancy Woman written by Paul Magrs and featured in the anthology, going on to win this prestigious award.

Early life and education 
The youngest of seven children, Samantha was born Samantha Lee Harrison in Manchester, England, which forms the partial backdrop of her novel Killing Kiss and is the common location of the Vampire Gene series. In a recent interview with The Daily Express, Howe admitted that her father was abusive and that she was also in an unhappy first marriage because of Domestic violence. As a result, Howe is now a Survivor Ambassador for Yorkshire charity Independent Domestic Abuse Serives also known as IDAS. Despite this difficult start, she graduated with a BA (Hons) in English and Writing for Performance at University of Bolton, a PGCE at Manchester University and her MA in Creative Writing also at Bolton. Her eventual first novel, Gabriele Caccini, was originally written as her dissertation. Stone worked as an English teacher at St Christopher's Church of England High School, Accrington until 2007, where she decided to leave her position after it was discovered that she was the author of Gabriele Caccini, which she had written under the pen name of Paigan Stone.

Early career 
Stone's debut novel, Gabriele Caccinipublished under her original pen name, Paigan Stonewas recognized by Foreword Reviews, an American literary magazine specializing in reviewing books from independent publishers, at its INDIES Book of the Year Awards with its INDIE Silver Award in Horror for 2007. She was shortlisted for the August Derleth Award for Best Novel in the British Fantasy Awards for her second novel, Futile Flame. This book was also a 2009 finalist in the ForeWord Book of the Year Awards, while the third book in the series, Demon Dance, was a finalist for the 2010 Foreword awards and won the August Derleth Award for Best Novel in the British Fantasy Awards 2011. This made Stone the first female writer to win the August Derleth Award since Tanith Lee did so in 1980. However, after the awards were announced, there was controversy over the voting and so Stone publicly returned the Award, not wishing to be associated with something which might have been awarded erroneously. The BFS then declared that the voting was valid, but then in a later statement announced that the Best Novel would be declared a 'No Award' for that year, assuming (without asking) that Stone's return of the award meant that she did not want it. She also won the Best Short Story Award in the British Fantasy Awards in the same year.

In August 2012 Telos Publishing issued a press release announcing the forthcoming audio of Stone's horror collection, Zombies In New York. Telos also published her Steampunk/horror novella Zombies at Tiffany's.

Gabriele Caccini was re-edited and re-released as Killing Kiss under the pen name Sam Stone in September 2008 by The House of Murky Depths. Writer Tanith Lee gave a quote for the back of the book which said : "A deceptively readable date with darkness – watch your step! This book is lit for the much more discerning chick (and cock) who likes to walk in the shadows. Relax with it, but be prepared for sudden jewels and little masterpieces – and the rug to be pulled from under your feet."

Stone went on to write a further four titles in the Vampire Gene series: Futile Flame, Demon Dance, Hateful Heart and Silent Sand. She then moved to Telos Publishing for reprints of the series and the first print of the final novel, Jaded Jewel.

In 2011 a short story collection, Zombies in New York and Other Bloody Jottings, was published by Telos Publishing. The collection was later picked up in October 2012 by AudioGo.

In 2013 it was announced that Stone was involved as a screenwriter for a Doctor Who spin-off film; White Witch of Devil's End was released on 13 November 2017 on DVD as part of "The Daemons of Devil's End" boxset by Reeltime Pictures.

 The book went to print in January 2018.

Awards and nominations
Gabriele Caccini: 2007 ForeWord Magazine Book of Year Awards Silver Award Winner for Best Horror Novel
Futile Flame: 2010 British Fantasy Award finalist
Futile Flame: 2009 Foreword Magazine Book of the Year Awards Finalist
Demon Dance: 2010 ForeWord Magazine Book of Year Awards Finalist
Demon Dance: 2011 British Fantasy Society Awards 2011 Winner – subsequently returned due to the initial controversy, but 'No Award' stated by the BFS despite the awards being cleared of any issues.
Fool's Gold: Short fiction: 2011 British Fantasy Society Awards 2011 Winner

Writing credits

Novels, novellas and collections
Samantha Lee Howe Novels
Kill A Spy Book #3 House of Killers HarperCollins' One More Chapter Imprint - 
Kill Or Die Book #2 House of Killers HarperCollins' One More Chapter Imprint - 
The House of Killers Book #1 House of Killers HarperCollins' One More Chapter Imprint - 
The Stranger In Our Bed HarperCollins' One More Chapter Imprint - 

Sam Stone Novels
Posing For Picasso SLH Ltd - 
Jinx Bound Telos Publishing - 
Posing For Picasso Wordfire Press - 
Jaded Jewel Telos Publishing - 
Jinx Magic Telos Publishing - 
Kat of Green Tentacles Telos Publishing - 
Jinx Town Telos Publishing – 
The Darkness Within – Final Cut Telos Publishing -
Kat on a Hot Tin Airship, Telos Publishing – 
Gabriele Caccini – 
Killing Kiss, Book 1 in the Vampire Gene Series – The House of Murky Depths –  
Futile Flame, Book 2 in the Vampire Gene Series – The House of Murky Depths – 
Demon Dance, Book 3 in the Vampire Gene Series – The House of Murky Depths – 
Hateful Heart, A Vampire Gene Novel – The House of Murky Depths – 
Silent Sand, A Vampire Gene Novel – The House of Murky Depths – 

Novellas
Ten Little Demons* Telos Publishing  Nov 2018
Kat and the Pendulum* Telos Publishing 
What's Dead PussyKat, Telos Publishing 
The Darkness Within, AudioGo  Oct 2013 Hardback Large Print
Zombies at Tiffany's, Telos Publishing  Sep 2012

Collections
Legends of Cthulhu and Other Nightmares - Telos Publishing  Oct 2019
The Complete Lightfoot - Limited Hardback of All Kat Lightfoot Tales - Telos Publishing  Jan 2019
Cthulhu and Other Monsters - Collection of Lovecraftian and other tales - Telos Publishing  
Zombies in New York & Other Bloody Jottings – Collection of stories and poetry – Telos Publishing

Audio
Freya The Confessions of Dorian Gray Season 4 - Big Finish November 2015
Zombies at Tiffany's – Spokenworld Audio October 2013
The Darkness Within – AudioGo – October 2013.
Zombies in New York and Other Bloody Jottings – AudioGo  October 2012.

Screenwriting
Samantha Lee Howe
The Stranger in Our Bed - Buffalo Dragon - Release in USA on Showtime 1st July 2022

Sam Stone
The White Witch of Devil's End – Reeltime Pictures – Release in Nov 2017 as DVD 6 part Drama.

Short stories
Samantha Lee Howe
Gwen - ( As S L Howe) Short Fiction Contribution "Terror Tales of the West Country" Telos Publishing Oct 2022
Trophy Wife - Short Fiction Contirbution "Black in the Night" Titan Books Oct 2022
Slash - Short Fiction Contribution "Criminal Pursuits: Crimes Through Time", Telos Publishing Oct 2021
The Dead Don't Die Twice, - Short Fiction Contribution "Straight Outta Dodge City", Baen Books Feb 2020

Sam Stone
The Bastet Society, - Short Fiction Contribution "Tails of Terror", Golden Goblin Dec 2018
Prologue, The Inheritance, Epilogue - Short Fiction Contributions "The Daemons of Devil's End", Telos Publishing Nov 2017 
Sacrifice - Short Fiction Contribution "Through a Mythos Darkly" - PS Publishing Jun 17
The Curse of the Blue Diamond - Short Fiction Contribution - "The Further Associates of Sherlock Holmes" Titan Books Oct 2017
Breaking Point - Short Fiction Contribution "Return of the Old Ones" - Dark Regions Press Mar 17
The Gold of Roatan - Short Fiction Contribution "Dread Shadows in Paradise" - Golden Goblin 2016
Tell Me No Lies - Short Story Contribution "Heroes of Red Hook" - Golden Goblin 2016
The Puppet Master - Short Story Contribution "Edge of Sundown" - Chaosium Dec 2016
Fallout - Short Story Contribution "Atomic Age Cthulhu" - Chaosium May 2015
The Curse of Guangxu - Short Story Contribution "The Mammoth Book of Sherlock Holmes Abroad" - Constable and Robinson April 2015
A Is for Acluaphobia: The Promise - Short Fiction Contribution "Phobophobias" Western Legends Dec 2014
The Vessel – Short Story Contribution "The Dark Rites of Cthulhu" – April Moon Books March 2014
Sonar City – Short Story Contribution "Eldritch Chrome" – Chaosium December 2013
The Jealous Sea – Short Story Contribution "Terror Tales of the Seaside" Gray Friar Press – Oct 2013
The Last Resort - Short Fiction Contribution "Fear the Reaper" Crystal Lake Publishing Oct 2013
Imogen – Short Story Contribution "Best British Fantasy" – Salt Publishing April 2013
Urban Wolf – Short Story Contribution "Demonologia Biblica" Western Legends – Feb 2013.
Imogen – Short Story Contribution "Siblings" – Hersham Horror Sept 2012
Hammer Out Books of Ghosts – Short Story Contributions "Immortal Monster" and "Chillers and Breathers" –  Published by Fantom Films
Full Fathom Forty – Short Story Contribution "The Toymaker's House" –  – published by The British Fantasy Society
BFS Journal – Short Story Contribution "Walking the Dead" – published by The British Fantasy Society
The Bitten Word – Short Story Contribution "Fool's Gold" – NewCon Press

Editor
Criminal Pursuits: Crimes Through Time - Telos Publishing Oct 2021 
The Daemons of Devil's End - Telos Publishing -  Standard Edition  Special Edition
with David J. Howe – Hines Sight – Autobiography of Actor Frazer Hines – 
Rules of Duel by Graham Masterton – Telos Publishing – 
Dark Horizons, part of the BFS Journal, Winter 2010 – published by The British Fantasy Society
Talespinning by David J. Howe Telos Publishing, Sep 2011 –

Current publishers
HarperCollins: The Stranger in our Bed; The House of Killers; Kill or Die; Kill A Spy
Telos Publishing: Zombies in New York and Other Bloody Jottings; Kat Lighfoot Mysteries; Jinx Chronicles; Vampire Gene series; The Darkness Within: Final Cut; Cthulhu and Other Monsters
Spokenworld Audio: Zombies At Tiffany's
Constable and Robinson: The Mammoth Book of Sherlock Holmes Abroad
Titan Books: The Further Associates of Sherlock Holmes; Black is the Night
PS Publishing Through A Mythos Darkly
Golden Goblin: Dread Shadows in Paradise; Heroes of Red Hook
Dark Regions Press: Return of the Old Ones
Big Finish Productions: The Confessions of Dorian Gray 
Chaosium: Edge of Sundown; Eldritch Chrome; Atomic Age Cthulhu

Former publisher
Wordfire Press: Posing for Picasso
The House of Murky Depths: Killing Kiss; Futile Flame; Demon Dance; Hateful Heart; Silent Sand
Audible: Zombies in New York and Other Bloody Jottings; The Darkness Within

References

External links
 
 

Living people
Alumni of the University of Bolton
English horror writers
Writers from Manchester
Year of birth missing (living people)
English women novelists